Sant’Antonio Abate is a Baroque-style, Roman Catholic church and convent located at Piazza Cavour in the town of Chieri, Province of Turin, region of Piedmont, Italy.

History
The church was reconstructed by the Jesuit order in the 17th century using designs by Filippo Juvarra, and refurbished by the architect Giuseppe Giacinto Bays in 1767. The Via Crucis panels were sculpted by Giovanni Battista Bernero. The adjacent convent is occupied by both Jesuits and commercial business.

References

Roman Catholic churches in Chieri
18th-century Roman Catholic church buildings in Italy
Roman Catholic churches completed in 1767
Baroque church buildings in Piedmont
Filippo Juvarra buildings